Agha Talal is a Pakistani television actor. He made his debut with Hum TV's Yaqeen Ka Safar and also appeared as leads in Noor (2018), Soya Mera Naseeb (2019) and Chamak Damak (2020).

Filmography

Television

Telefilm

References

Year of birth missing (living people)
Living people
Place of birth missing (living people)
Pakistani male television actors